Aberdeen F.C. competed in the Scottish Football League in season 1916–17.

Overview

For the first time in the club's history, Aberdeen finished bottom of the league table. Also this season, club records for the lowest attendance at Pittodrie Stadium and heaviest defeat were set. At the conclusion of the season, Aberdeen (along with other clubs) withdrew from football for two years due to the ongoing First World War.

Results

Scottish Football League

Final standings

Scottish Cup

The Scottish Cup was suspended this season because of the First World War.

Squad

Appearances & Goals

|}

References

Aberdeen F.C. seasons
Aberdeen